Wallace Norman Harris (22 February 1900 – 7 September 1933) was an English professional footballer. Born in Birmingham, he played as an outside right for Birmingham and Walsall in the Football League during the 1920s. Released by Birmingham due to health problems, he retired not long afterwards and died in a sanatorium in Davos, Switzerland, aged 33.

References
General

Specific

1900 births
1933 deaths
Footballers from Birmingham, West Midlands
English footballers
Association football wingers
Burton Town F.C. players
Birmingham City F.C. players
Walsall F.C. players
English Football League players